Parksosaurus (meaning "William Parks's lizard") is a genus of neornithischian dinosaur from the early Maastrichtian-age Upper Cretaceous Horseshoe Canyon Formation of Alberta, Canada. It is based on most of a partially articulated skeleton and partial skull, showing it to have been a small, bipedal, herbivorous dinosaur. It is one of the few described non-hadrosaurid ornithopods from the end of the Cretaceous in North America, existing around 70 million years ago.

Description
 
Explicit estimates of the entire size of the animal are rare; in 2010 Gregory S. Paul estimated the length at 2.5 meters, the weight at forty-five kilograms. William Parks found the hindlimb of his T. warreni to be about the same length overall as that of Thescelosaurus neglectus (93.0 centimeters (3.05 ft) for T. warreni versus 95.5 centimeters (3.13 ft) for T. neglectus), even though the shin was shorter than the thigh in T. neglectus, the opposite of T. warreni. Thus, the animal would have been comparable to the better-known Thescelosaurus in linear dimensions, despite proportional differences (around 1 meter (3.3 ft) tall at the hips, 2-2.5 meters (6.56-8.2 ft) long). The proportional differences probably would have made it lighter, though, as less weight was concentrated near the thigh. Like Thescelosaurus, it had thin partly ossified cartilaginous (intercostal) plates along the ribs. The shoulder girdle was robust. Parksosaurus had at least eighteen teeth in the maxilla and about twenty in the lower jaw; the number of teeth in the premaxilla is unknown.

Discovery and history
 
Paleontologist William Parks described skeleton ROM 804 in 1926 as Thescelosaurus warreni, which had in 1922 been discovered in what was then called the Edmonton Formation near Rumsey Ferry on the Red Deer River.  When found, it consisted of a partial skull missing the beak region, most of the left pectoral girdle (including a suprascapula, a bone more commonly found in lizards, but which is believed to have been present in cartilaginous form in some ornithopods due to the roughened ends of their scapulae), the left arm except the hand, ribs and sternal elements, a damaged left pelvis, right ischium, the left leg except for some toe bones, articulated vertebrae from the back, hip, and tail, and a number of ossified tendons that sheathed the end of the tail. The body of the animal had fallen on its left side, and most of the right side had been destroyed before burial; in addition, the head had been separated from the body, and the neck lost. Parks differentiated the new species from T. neglectus by leg proportions; T. warreni had a longer tibia than femur, and longer toes.

Charles M. Sternberg, upon the discovery of the specimen he named Thescelosaurus edmontonensis, revisited T. warreni and found that it warranted its own genus (it was named in an abstract, which is not typical, but the specimen had already been thoroughly described). In 1940, he presented a more thorough comparison and found a number of differences between the two genera throughout the body. He assigned Parksosaurus to the Hypsilophodontinae with Hypsilophodon and Dysalotosaurus, and Thescelosaurus to the Thescelosaurinae. The genus attracted little attention until Peter Galton began his revision of hypsilophodonts in the 1970s. Parksosaurus received a redescription in 1973, wherein it was considered to be related to a Hypsilophodon\Laosaurus\L. minimus lineage. After this, it once again returned to obscurity.

George Olshevsky emended the species name to P. warrenae in 1992, because the species name honors a woman (Mrs. H. D.  Warren who financially supported the research), but outside of Internet sites, the original spelling has been preferred.

Classification
 
Parksosaurus has been considered to be a hypsilophodont since its description. Recent reviews have dealt with it with little comment, although David B. Norman and colleagues (2004), in the framework of a paraphyletic Hypsilophodontidae, found it to be the sister taxon to Thescelosaurus, and Richard Butler and colleagues (2008) found that it may be close to the South American genus Gasparinisaura. However, basal ornithopod phylogeny is poorly known at this point, albeit under study. Like Thescelosaurus, Parksosaurus had a relatively robust hindlimb, and an elongate skull without as much of an arched shape to the forehead compared to other hypsilophodonts. A 2015 study placed it as an intermediate member of Iguanodontia more derived than Elasmaria.

Cladogram based in the phylogenetic analysis of Rozadilla et al., 2015:

The cladogram below results from analysis by Herne et al., 2019, which placed Parksosaurus as the most basal member of Ornithopoda.

Paleoecology and paleobiology

Parksosaurus is known from the base of Unit 4 of the Horseshoe Canyon Formation, which dates to about 69.5 million years ago. Other dinosaur species from this same unit include the theropods Albertosaurus sarcophagus and Albertavenator curriei as well as the spike-crested hadrosaurid Saurolophus osborni, hollow-crested hadrosaurid Hypacrosaurus altispinus, and ankylosaurid Anodontosaurus lambei. Teeth of an unidentified ceratopsian species are known from the same stratigraphic level. The dinosaurs from this formation are sometimes known as Edmontonian, after a land mammal age, and are distinct from those in the formations above and below. The Horseshoe Canyon Formation is interpreted as having a significant marine influence, due to an encroaching Western Interior Seaway, the shallow sea that covered the midsection of North America through much of the Cretaceous.

In life, Parksosaurus, as a hypsilophodont, would have been a small, swift bipedal herbivore. It would have had a moderately long neck and small head with a horny beak, short but strong forelimbs, and long powerful hindlimbs. Paul in 2010 suggested that the long toes were an adaptation for walking over mud or clay near rivers and that the strong arms were used for burrowing.

References

External links

 Parksosaurus in the Natural History Museum's Dino Directory

Fossils of Canada
Late Cretaceous dinosaurs of North America
Fossil taxa described in 1937
Taxa named by Charles Mortram Sternberg
Paleontology in Alberta
Maastrichtian genus first appearances
Maastrichtian genus extinctions
Ornithischian genera